Rodolphe Bresdin was a French draughtsman and engraver, born in Le Fresne-sur-Loire on 12 August 1822, who died in Sèvres on 11 January 1885.

Work
His fantastic works, full of strange details, particularly attracted Charles Baudelaire, Théophile Gautier, Joris-Karl Huysmans, Robert de Montesquiou  and André Breton. Odilon Redon  was his pupil. Bresdin influenced contemporary artists like Jacques Moreau, George Rubel, Jean-Pierre Velly, and Philippe Mohlitz. Bresdin's life story and his art are both extraordinary and fascinating. He was one of the finest and most original exponents of the art of print-making in the nineteenth century and his name ranks alongside those of Whistler, Doré and Meryon in achievement and influence.

Huysmans described in his beautifully written, arresting novel À rebours ('Against Nature', alternative translation, 'Against the Grain') how his aesthete hero, Des Esseintes, 'in search of the rarest perfumes of visual splendours', has just savoured the prints of Jan Luyken, 'an old Dutch engraver almost unknown in France' :

"In the adjoining room, the vestibule, a larger apartment panelled with cedar wood the colour of a cigar box, were ranged in rows other engravings and drawings equally extraordinary.

Bresdin's 'Comedy of Death' was one, where an impossible landscape bristling with trees, coppices and thickets taking the shape of demons and phantoms, swarming with birds having rat's heads and tails of vegetables, from a soil littered with human bones, vertebrae, ribs and skulls, spring willows, knotted and gnarled, surmounted by skeletons tossing their arms in unison and chanting a hymn of victory, while a Christ flies away to a sky dappled with little clouds; a hermit sits pondering, his head between his hands, in the recesses of a grotto; a beggar dies, worn out with privations, exhausted with hunger, stretched on his back, his feet extended towards a stagnant pool."

Another was 'the Good Samaritan' by the same artist, an immense pen and ink drawing lithographed, a wild entanglement of palms, service trees, oaks, growing all together in defiance of seasons and climates, an outburst of virgin forest, crammed with apes, owls and screech owls, cumbered with old stumps shapeless as roots of coral, a magic wood, pierced by a clearing dimly revealing far away, beyond a camel and the group of the Samaritan and the men who fell by the wayside, a river and behind it again a fairy-like city climbing to the horizon line, rising to meet a strange-looking sky, dotted with birds, woolly with rolling clouds, swelling as it were, with bales of vapour.

You would have thought it the work of an early Italian master or a half-developed Albert Dürer, composed under the influence of opium.' ('Against the Grain', 
New York: Dover, 1971, p. 59)

Huysmans' description, although brilliantly conveying the mystique of Bresdin's work, does not fully do justice to the profundity of it. He only refers to two works, whereas Bresdin produced one hundred and forty etchings, twenty lithographs and a number of pen and ink drawings difficult to estimate.

Bresdin was, in part, a product of the Breton countryside with its sagacious, bardic folklore traditions, later beloved of Gauguin and his circle, and in part a refugee from the Paris Bohemia  of Henri Murger with its dolorous, witty intonations. His portrayals of the household interiors of the rural poor show uncanny empathy with their inhabitants and rapport with the imaginative hinterland of their psyches. His series of the Holy Family's flight to Egypt was highly praised by Redon, who thought it Bresdin's best work, and by de Montesquiou. His depictions of nature, showing its seductive charm alongside its underlying menace are unique and some time spent with these works can change one's whole way of seeing the natural world.

Bresdin's life story is as dramatic and iconic as those of Van Gogh and Gauguin. It has the ingredients of a great Hollywood epic: childhood in the Breton countryside; a family row leaving him homeless in Paris and becoming part of the bohemian milieu with Charles Baudelaire, Henri Murger and Victor Hugo; after the counter revolution walking 678 kilometres to Toulouse; living in the open air, workmen's and fishermen's huts; taking a wife and six children to Canada in pursuit of the dream of 'living off the land'; rescued and brought back to France by Hugo and the bohemian writers and artists; separation from the family and death in a garret room in Sèvres.

Bibliography
 Jean Adhémar et Alix Gambier, Rodolphe Bresdin : 1822-1885 (catalogue de l'exposition à la Bibliothèque Nationale), Bibliothèque nationale, Paris, 1963, 47 p.) 
 Trevor Dance, "Rodolphe Bresdin: an Incorrigible Bohemian", published by Unicorn Press in October 2016.
 Joris-Karl Huysmans: 'A Rebours' 1884, translated as 'Against the Grain', Dover publications 1969, and 'Against Nature', Penguin Classics, 1959.

External links

French engravers
19th-century engravers
1822 births
1885 deaths
People from Loire-Atlantique
French draughtsmen